Eduardo Koaik (August 21, 1926 – August 25, 2012) was the Catholic bishop of the Diocese of Piracicaba, Brazil.

Ordained to the priesthood in 1950, Koaik was named bishop in 1973. He retired in 2002.

Notes

1926 births
2012 deaths
People from Manaus
Brazilian people of Lebanese descent
20th-century Roman Catholic bishops in Brazil
Roman Catholic bishops of São Sebastião do Rio de Janeiro
Roman Catholic bishops of Piracicaba